Panthera tigris trinilensis, known as the Trinil tiger, is an extinct tiger subspecies dating from about 1.2 million years ago that was found at the locality of Trinil, Java, Indonesia. The fossil remains are now stored in the Dubois Collection of the National Museum of Natural History in Leiden, the Netherlands. Although these fossils have been found on Java, the Trinil tiger is probably not a direct ancestor of the Javan tiger. The Trinil tiger probably became extinct 50,000 years ago. The Bali tiger was also not closely related to the Trinil because of their time differences.

It lived in Indonesia, particularly in Java and Trinil, and according to some zoologists, it could be the ancestor of all known Indonesian subspecies. Perhaps, East Asia was a center of the origin of Pantherinae. The oldest tiger fossils found in Early Pleistocene Java show that about two million years ago, tigers were already quite common in East Asia. However, the glacial and interglacial climatic variations and other geological events may have caused repeated geographic changes in the area.

Taxonomy
Much research has been done but there is not much knowledge about this subspecies. Scientists have discovered a fossil that is believed to belong to the Trinil tiger. However, there were doubts that the fossil could belong to the Trinil tiger because it was too big to belong to it. But now it is thought that it might have been a bit smaller than the Bengal tigers and similar to the Indochinese tiger's size.

See also 
 Bornean tiger
 Panthera tigris acutidens
 Panthera tigris soloensis
 Panthera zdanskyi

Notes and references

References

tigris trinilensis
tigris trinilensis
Pleistocene carnivorans
Pleistocene mammals of Asia
Extinct animals of Indonesia
Fossil taxa described in 1908